Yoar (also Romanized as Yo‘ār and Ya‘ār; also known as Ya‘ād) is a village in Gheyzaniyeh Rural District, in the Central District of Ahvaz County, Khuzestan Province, Iran. At the 2006 census, its population was 123, in 23 families.

References 

Populated places in Ahvaz County